Oxyurichthys ophthalmonema, the eyebrow goby, is a species of goby is found in the Indo-West Pacific and western central Pacific.

References

Hoese, D.F., 1986. Gobiidae. p. 774-807. In M.M. Smith and P.C. Heemstra (eds.) Smiths' sea fishes. Springer-Verlag, Berlin. 

ophthalmonema
Fish of the Pacific Ocean
Taxa named by Pieter Bleeker
Fish described in 1856